This is a list of the largest metropolitan areas in the West Indies, based on official population estimates or projections as of mid-2015. Havana has no official definition of its metropolitan area; the population within its city limits is given instead.

See also
 List of Caribbean countries by population
 List of populated places in the Caribbean

Notes

References 

Populated places in the Caribbean
Metropolitan areas
Caribbean